Near-sightedness, also known as myopia and short-sightedness, is an eye disease where light focuses in front of, instead of on, the retina. As a result, distant objects appear blurry while close objects appear normal. Other symptoms may include headaches and eye strain. Severe near-sightedness is associated with an increased risk of retinal detachment, cataracts, and glaucoma.

The underlying mechanism involves the length of the eyeball growing too long or less commonly the lens being too strong. It is a type of refractive error. Diagnosis is by eye examination.

Tentative evidence indicates that the risk of near-sightedness can be decreased by having young children spend more time outside. This decrease in risk may be related to natural light exposure. Near-sightedness can be corrected with eyeglasses, contact lenses, or a refractive surgery. Eyeglasses are the easiest and safest method of correction. Contact lenses can provide a wider field of vision, but are associated with a risk of infection. Refractive surgery permanently changes the shape of the cornea.

Near-sightedness is the most common eye problem and is estimated to affect 1.5 billion people (22% of the world population). Rates vary significantly in different areas of the world. Rates among adults are between 15% to 49%. Among children, it affects 1% of rural Nepalese, 4% of South Africans, 12% of people in the US, and 37% in some large Chinese cities. In China the proportion of girls is slightly higher than boys. Rates have increased since the 1950s. Uncorrected near-sightedness is one of the most common causes of vision impairment globally along with cataracts, macular degeneration, and vitamin A deficiency.

Etymology
The opposite of myopia in English is hyperopia, or far-sightedness.

Signs and symptoms

A near-sighted individual can see clearly out to a certain distance (the far point of the eye), but objects placed beyond this distance appear blurred. If the extent of the myopia is great enough, even standard reading distances can be affected. Upon routine examination of the eyes, the vast majority of myopic eyes appear structurally identical to nonmyopic eyes.

Onset is often in school children, with worsening between the ages of 8 and 15.

Causes
The underlying cause is believed to be a combination of genetic and environmental factors. Risk factors include doing work that involves focusing on close objects, greater time spent indoors, urbanization, and a family history of the condition. It is also associated with a high socioeconomic class and higher level of education.

A 2012 review could not find strong evidence for any single cause, although many theories have been discredited. Twin studies indicate that at least some genetic factors are involved. Myopia has been increasing rapidly throughout the developed world, suggesting environmental factors are involved.

A single-author literature review in 2021 proposed that myopia is the result of corrective lenses interfering with emmetropization.

Genetics
A risk for myopia may be inherited from one's parents. Genetic linkage studies have identified 18 possible loci on 15 different chromosomes that are associated with myopia, but none of these loci is part of the candidate genes that cause myopia. Instead of a simple one-gene locus controlling the onset of myopia, a complex interaction of many mutated proteins acting in concert may be the cause. Instead of myopia being caused by a defect in a structural protein, defects in the control of these structural proteins might be the actual cause of myopia. A collaboration of all myopia studies worldwide identified 16 new loci for refractive error in individuals of European ancestry, of which 8 were shared with Asians. The new loci include candidate genes with functions in neurotransmission, ion transport, retinoic acid metabolism, extracellular matrix remodeling and eye development. The carriers of the high-risk genes have a tenfold increased risk of myopia. Aberrant genetic recombination and gene splicing in the OPNLW1 and OPNMW1 genes that code for two retinal cone photopigment proteins can produce high myopia by interfering with refractive development of the eye.

Human population studies suggest that contribution of genetic factors accounts for 60–90% of variance in refraction. However, the currently identified variants account for only a small fraction of myopia cases, suggesting the existence of a large number of yet unidentified low-frequency or small-effect variants, which underlie the majority of myopia cases.

Environmental factors
Environmental factors which increase the risk of nearsightedness include insufficient light exposure, low physical activity, near work, and increased year of education.

One hypothesis is that a lack of normal visual stimuli causes improper development of the eyeball. Under this hypothesis, "normal" refers to the environmental stimuli that the eyeball evolved to. Modern humans who spend most of their time indoors, in dimly or fluorescently lit buildings may be at risk of development of myopia.

People, and children especially, who spend more time doing physical exercise and outdoor play have lower rates of myopia, suggesting the increased magnitude and complexity of the visual stimuli encountered during these types of activities decrease myopic progression. There is preliminary evidence that the protective effect of outdoor activities on the development of myopia is due, at least in part, to the effect of long hours of exposure to daylight on the production and the release of retinal dopamine.

Myopia can be induced with minus spherical lenses, and overminus in prescription lenses can induce myopia progression. Overminus during refraction can be avoided through various techniques and tests, such as fogging, plus to blur, and the duochrome test.

The near work hypothesis, also referred to as the "use-abuse theory" states that spending time involved in near work strains the intraocular and extraocular muscles. Some studies support the hypothesis, while other studies do not. While an association is present, it is not clearly causal.

Nearsightedness is also more common in children with diabetes, childhood arthritis, uveitis, and systemic lupus erythematosus.

Mechanism
Because myopia is a refractive error, the physical cause of myopia is comparable to any optical system that is out of focus. Borish and Duke-Elder classified myopia by these physical causes:
 Axial myopia is attributed to an increase in the eye's axial length 
 Refractive myopia is attributed to the condition of the refractive elements of the eye. Borish further subclassified refractive myopia:
 Curvature myopia is attributed to excessive, or increased, curvature of one or more of the refractive surfaces of the eye, especially the cornea. In those with Cohen syndrome, myopia appears to result from high corneal and lenticular power.
 Index myopia is attributed to variation in the index of refraction of one or more of the ocular media.

As with any optical system experiencing a defocus aberration, the effect can be exaggerated or masked by changing the aperture size. In the case of the eye, a large pupil emphasizes refractive error and a small pupil masks it. This phenomenon can cause a condition in which an individual has a greater difficulty seeing in low-illumination areas, even though there are no symptoms in bright light, such as daylight.

Under rare conditions, edema of the ciliary body can cause an anterior displacement of the lens, inducing a myopia shift in refractive error.

Diagnosis
A diagnosis of myopia is typically made by an eye care professional, usually an optometrist or ophthalmologist. During a refraction, an autorefractor or retinoscope is used to give an initial objective assessment of the refractive status of each eye, then a phoropter is used to subjectively refine the patient's eyeglass prescription. Other types of refractive error are hyperopia, astigmatism, and presbyopia.

Types
Various forms of myopia have been described by their clinical appearance:
 Simple myopia: Myopia in an otherwise normal eye, typically less than 4.00 to 6.00 diopters. This is the most common form of myopia.
 Degenerative myopia, also known as malignant, pathological, or progressive myopia, is characterized by marked fundus changes, such as posterior staphyloma, and associated with a high refractive error and subnormal visual acuity after correction. This form of myopia gets progressively worse over time. Degenerative myopia has been reported as one of the main causes of visual impairment.
 Pseudomyopia is the blurring of distance vision brought about by spasm of the accommodation system.
 Nocturnal myopia: Without adequate stimulus for accurate accommodation, the accommodation system partially engages, pushing distance objects out of focus.
 Nearwork-induced transient myopia (NITM): short-term myopic far point shift immediately following a sustained near visual task. Some authors argue for a link between NITM and the development of permanent myopia.
 Instrument myopia: over-accommodation when looking into an instrument such as a microscope.
 Induced myopia, also known as acquired myopia, results from various medications, increases in glucose levels, nuclear sclerosis, oxygen toxicity (e.g., from diving or from oxygen and hyperbaric therapy) or other anomalous conditions. Sulphonamide therapy can cause ciliary body edema, resulting in anterior displacement of the lens, pushing the eye out of focus. Elevation of blood-glucose levels can also cause edema (swelling) of the crystalline lens as a result of sorbitol accumulating in the lens. This edema often causes temporary myopia. Scleral buckles, used in the repair of retinal detachments may induce myopia by increasing the axial length of the eye.
 Index myopia is attributed to variation in the index of refraction of one or more of the ocular media. Cataracts may lead to index myopia.
 Form deprivation myopia occurs when the eyesight is deprived by limited illumination and vision range, or the eye is modified with artificial lenses or deprived of clear form vision. In lower vertebrates, this kind of myopia seems to be reversible within short periods of time. Myopia is often induced this way in various animal models to study the pathogenesis and mechanism of myopia development.

Degree
The degree of myopia is described in terms of the power of the ideal correction, which is measured in diopters:
 Myopia between −0.00 and −0.50 diopters is usually classified as emmetropia.
 Low myopia usually describes myopia between −0.50 and −3.00 diopters.
 Moderate myopia usually describes myopia between −3.00 and −6.00 diopters. Those with moderate amounts of myopia are more likely to have pigment dispersion syndrome or pigmentary glaucoma.
 High myopia usually describes myopia of −6.00 or more. People with high myopia are more likely to have retinal detachments and primary open angle glaucoma. They are also more likely to experience floaters, shadow-like shapes which appear in the field of vision. In addition to this, high myopia is linked to macular degeneration, cataracts, and significant visual impairment.

Age at onset
Myopia is sometimes classified by the age at onset:
 Congenital myopia, also known as infantile myopia, is present at birth and persists through infancy.
 Youth onset myopia occurs in early childhood or teenage, and the ocular power can keep varying until the age of 21, before which any form of corrective surgery is usually not recommended by ophthalmic specialists around the world.
 School myopia appears during childhood, particularly the school age years. This form of myopia is attributed to the use of the eyes for close work during the school years. A 2004–2015 Singapore–Sydney study of children of Chinese descent found that time spent on outdoor activities was a factor.
 Adult onset myopia

 Early adult onset myopia occurs between ages 20 and 40.
Late adult onset myopia occurs after age 40.

Prevention
Various methods have been employed in an attempt to decrease the progression of myopia, although studies show mixed results. Many myopia treatment studies have a number of design drawbacks: small numbers, lack of adequate control group, and failure to mask examiners from knowledge of treatments used. Among myopia specialists, mydriatic eyedrops are the most favored approach, applied by almost 75% in North America and more than 80% in Australia. A 2015 review suggested that increased outdoor time protects young children from myopia. A 2020 study of global practice patterns used by paediatric ophthalmologists to decrease the progression of myopia showed behavioral intervention (counseling to spend more time outdoors and less time with near-work) to be favored by 25% of specialists, usually in addition to medications.

Glasses and contacts 
The use of reading glasses when doing close work may improve vision by reducing or eliminating the need to accommodate. Altering the use of eyeglasses between full-time, part-time, and not at all does not appear to alter myopia progression. The American Optometric Association's Clinical Practice Guidelines found evidence of effectiveness of bifocal lenses and recommends it as the method for "myopia control". In some studies, bifocal and progressive lenses have not shown differences in altering the progression of myopia compared to placebo.

In 2019, contact lenses to prevent the worsening of nearsightedness in children were approved for use in the United States. This "MiSight" type claims to work by focusing peripheral light in front of the retina.

Medication
Anti-muscarinic topical medications in children under 18 years of age may slow the worsening of myopia. These treatments include pirenzepine gel, cyclopentolate eye drops, and atropine eye drops. While these treatments were shown to be effective in slowing the progression of myopia, side effects included light sensitivity and near blur.

Other methods 
Scleral reinforcement surgery is aimed to cover the thinning posterior pole with a supportive material to withstand intraocular pressure and prevent further progression of the posterior staphyloma. The strain is reduced, although damage from the pathological process cannot be reversed. By stopping the progression of the disease, vision may be maintained or improved.

Treatment
The National Institutes of Health says there is no known way of preventing myopia, and the use of glasses or contact lenses does not affect its progression, unless the glasses or contact lenses are too strong of a prescription. There is no universally accepted method of preventing myopia and proposed methods need additional study to determine their effectiveness. Optical correction using glasses or contact lenses is the most common treatment; other approaches include orthokeratology, and refractive surgery. Medications (mostly atropine) and vision therapy can be effective in addressing the various forms of pseudomyopia.

Glasses and contacts

Corrective lenses bend the light entering the eye in a way that places a focused image accurately onto the retina. The power of any lens system can be expressed in diopters, the reciprocal of its focal length in meters. Corrective lenses for myopia have negative powers because a divergent lens is required to move the far point of focus out to the distance. More severe myopia needs lens powers further from zero (more negative). However, strong eyeglass prescriptions create distortions such as prismatic movement and chromatic aberration. Strongly near-sighted wearers of contact lenses do not experience these distortions because the lens moves with the cornea, keeping the optic axis in line with the visual axis and because the vertex distance has been reduced to zero.

Surgery
Refractive surgery includes procedures which alter the corneal curvature of some structure of the eye or which add additional refractive means inside the eye.

Photorefractive keratectomy

Photorefractive keratectomy (PRK) involves ablation of corneal tissue from the corneal surface using an excimer laser. The amount of tissue ablation corresponds to the amount of myopia. While PRK is a relatively safe procedure for up to 6 dioptres of myopia, the recovery phase post-surgery is usually painful.

LASIK
In a LASIK pre-procedure, a corneal flap is cut into the cornea and lifted to allow the excimer laser beam access to the exposed corneal tissue. After that, the excimer laser ablates the tissue according to the required correction. When the flap again covers the cornea, the change in curvature generated by the laser ablation proceeds to the corneal surface. Though LASIK is usually painless and involves a short rehabilitation period post-surgery, it can potentially result in flap complications and loss of corneal stability (post-LASIK keratectasia).

Phakic intra-ocular lens
Instead of modifying the corneal surface, as in laser vision correction (LVC), this procedure involves implanting an additional lens inside the eye (i.e., in addition to the already existing natural lens). While it usually results in good control of the refractive change, it can induce potential serious long-term complications such as glaucoma, cataract and endothelial decompensation.

Orthokeratology

Orthokeratology or simply Ortho-K is a temporary corneal reshaping process using rigid gas permeable (RGP) contact lenses. Overnight wearing of specially designed contact lenses will temporarily reshape cornea, so patients may see clearly without any lenses in daytime. Orthokeratology can correct myopia up to -6D. Several studies shown that Ortho-K can reduce myopia progression also. Risk factors of using Ortho-K lenses include microbial keratitis, corneal edema, etc. Other contact lens related complications like corneal aberration, photophobia, pain, irritation, redness etc. are usually temporary conditions, which may be eliminated by proper usage of lenses.

Intrastromal corneal ring segment
The Intrastromal corneal ring segment (ICRS), commonly used in keratoconus treatment now, was originally designed to correct mild to moderate myopia. The thickness is directly related to flattening and the diameter of the ring is proportionally inverse to the flattening of cornea. So, if diameter is smaller or thickness is greater, resulting myopia correction will be greater.

Alternative medicine
A number of alternative therapies have been claimed to improve myopia, including vision therapy, "behavioural optometry", various eye exercises and relaxation techniques, and the Bates method. Scientific reviews have concluded that there was "no clear scientific evidence" that eye exercises are effective in treating near-sightedness and as such they "cannot be advocated".

Epidemiology
Global refractive errors have been estimated to affect 800 million to 2.3 billion. The incidence of myopia within sampled population often varies with age, country, sex, race, ethnicity, occupation, environment, and other factors. Variability in testing and data collection methods makes comparisons of prevalence and progression difficult.

The prevalence of myopia has been reported as high as 70–90% in some Asian countries, 30–40% in Europe and the United States, and 10–20% in Africa. Myopia is about twice as common in Jewish people than in people of non-Jewish ethnicity. Myopia is less common in African people and associated diaspora. In Americans between the ages of 12 and 54, myopia has been found to affect African Americans less than Caucasians.

Asia

In some parts of Asia, myopia is very common.
 Singapore is believed to have the highest prevalence of myopia in the world; up to 80% of people there have myopia, but the accurate figure is unknown.
 China's myopia rate is 31%: 400 million of its 1.3 billion people are myopic. The prevalence of myopia in high school in China is 77%, and in college is more than 80%.
 In some areas, such as China and Malaysia, up to 41% of the adult population is myopic to 1.00 dpt, and up to 80% to 0.5 dpt.
 A study of Jordanian adults aged 17 to 40 found over half (54%) were myopic.
 Some research suggests the prevalence of myopia in Indian children is less than 15%.

Europe

 In first-year undergraduate students in the United Kingdom 50% of British whites and 53% of British Asians were myopic.
 A recent review found 27% of Western Europeans aged 40 or over have at least −1.00 diopters of myopia and 5% have at least −5.00 diopters.

North America
Myopia is common in the United States, with research suggesting this condition has increased dramatically in recent decades. In 1971–1972, the National Health and Nutrition Examination Survey provided the earliest nationally representative estimates for myopia prevalence in the U.S., and found the prevalence in persons aged 12–54 was 25%. Using the same method, in 1999–2004, myopia prevalence was estimated to have climbed to 42%.

A study of 2,523 children in grades 1 to 8 (age, 5–17 years) found nearly one in 10 (9%) have at least −0.75 diopters of myopia. In this study, 13% had at least +1.25 D hyperopia (farsightedness), and 28% had at least 1.00-D difference between the two principal meridians (cycloplegic autorefraction) of astigmatism. For myopia, Asians had the highest prevalence (19%), followed by Hispanics (13%). Caucasian children had the lowest prevalence of myopia (4%), which was not significantly different from African Americans (7%).

A recent review found 25% of Americans aged 40 or over have at least −1.00 diopters of myopia and 5% have at least −5.00 diopters.

Australia
In Australia, the overall prevalence of myopia (worse than −0.50 diopters) has been estimated to be 17%. In one recent study, less than one in 10 (8%) Australian children between the ages of four and 12 were found to have myopia greater than −0.50 diopters. A recent review found 16% of Australians aged 40 or over have at least −1.00 diopters of myopia and 3% have at least −5.00 diopters.

South America
In Brazil, a 2005 study estimated 6% of Brazilians between the ages of 12 and 59 had −1.00 diopter of myopia or more, compared with 3% of the indigenous people in northwestern Brazil. Another found nearly 1 in 8 (13%) of the students in the city of Natal were myopic.

History
The difference between the near-sighted and far-sighted people was noted already by Aristotle. Graeco-Roman physician Galen first used the term "myopia" (from Greek words "myein" meaning "to close or shut" and "ops" (gen. opos) meaning "eye") for near-sightedness. The first spectacles for correcting myopia were invented by a German cardinal in the year 1451. Johannes Kepler in his Clarification of Ophthalmic Dioptrics (1604) first demonstrated that near-sightedness was due to the incident light focusing in front of the retina. Kepler also showed that near-sightedness could be corrected by concave lenses. In 1632, Vopiscus Fortunatus Plempius examined a myopic eye and confirmed that myopia was due to a lengthening of its axial diameter.

Society and culture 
The terms "myopia" and "myopic" (or the common terms "short-sightedness" or "short-sighted", respectively) have been used metaphorically to refer to cognitive thinking and decision making that is narrow in scope or lacking in foresight or in concern for wider interests or for longer-term consequences. It is often used to describe a decision that may be beneficial in the present, but detrimental in the future, or a viewpoint that fails to consider anything outside a very narrow and limited range. Hyperopia, the biological opposite of myopia, may also be used metaphorically for a value system or motivation that exhibits "farsighted" or possibly visionary thinking and behavior; that is, emphasizing long-term interests at the apparent expense of near-term benefit.

Correlations
Numerous studies have found correlations between myopia, on the one hand, and intelligence and academic achievement, on the other; it is not clear whether there is a causal relationship.
Myopia is also correlated with increased microsaccade amplitude, suggesting that blurred vision from myopia might cause instability in fixational eye movements.

See also 
 Myopia in animals
 Myopic crescent

References

External links 

Disorders of ocular muscles, binocular movement, accommodation and refraction
Vision
Wikipedia medicine articles ready to translate
Wikipedia neurology articles ready to translate
Disability